Loreto Mauleón (born 1988) is a Spanish actress. Early recognisable to a Basque audience for her performance in the soap opera Goenkale, she became known to a wider Spanish audience for her performances in El secreto de Puente Viejo and Patria. She has also featured in thriller film God's Crooked Lines (2022).

Biography 
Mauleón was born in Burgos in 1988, but, when she was barely 7-month old, she moved to San Sebastián, where she was raised. She studied at the ikastola Zurriola and the Peñaflorida high school. She studied Public Works at the University of the Basque Country.

She performed in 4 seasons of the Basque soap opera Goenkale. Her debut in a feature film came with a role in La máquina de pintar nubes (2009).

In 2012, she joined the cast of the second season of El secreto de Puente Viejo, performing the role of María Castañeda, which brought her public recognition. The character stopped appearing in the series in January 2015, after more than 600 episodes. Mauleón then starred in the Basque period drama series Aitaren Etxea and performed the role of Zita Polo in the miniseries Lo que escondían sus ojos. Mauleón returned to Puente Viejo to reprise the role of María Castañeda in 2016. She returned again to the series in 2018, leaving the series in 2019.

Mauleón's breakthrough role as Arantxa in Patria (2020) earned her critical acclaim and won her a Feroz Award for Best Supporting Actress. After an appearance in the miniseries Blowing Kisses, she joined the main cast of Express, which began filming in March 2021.

Filmography 

Film

Television

Accolades

References 

1988 births
Actresses from the Basque Country (autonomous community)
21st-century Spanish actresses
Spanish television actresses
Living people
People from Burgos
People from San Sebastián
University of the Basque Country alumni
Basque-language actors